The Journal of International Political Theory is a triannual peer-reviewed academic journal published by SAGE Publications. It was published by Edinburgh University Press between 2005 and 2013. The founding editor, and editor-in-chief until 2020, was Patrick Hayden (University of St Andrews). As of 2021, the editor-in-chief is Anthony F Lang, Jr (University of St Andrews).

Abstracting and indexing
The journal is abstracted and indexed in:
 Emerging Sources Citation Index
 Scopus
 ProQuest
 EBSCO

References

External links

Publications established in 2005
English-language journals
International relations journals
Triannual journals